Damien Richardson (born 2 August 1969) is an Australian film, television and theatre actor and writer. A graduate from the Victorian College of the Arts, Richardson has appeared in a variety of Australian films and television shows, including Blue Heelers, McLeod's Daughters, Redball, The Hard Word, Rogue, Conspiracy 365 and Wentworth. He and co-writer Luke Elliot won the Best New Comedy-Drama award at the Melbourne Fringe Festival for their play The Belly Of The Whale. One of Richardson's best known roles is Detective Matt Ryan in the crime drama City Homicide, which he played from 2007 until 2011. Since 2012, Richardson has starred as Drew Greer in the Jack Irish television films and subsequent 2016 series. He played Gary Canning in the soap opera Neighbours from 2014 to 2020.

Early and personal life
Richardson was born in Adelaide. He graduated from the Victorian College of the Arts in 1991. He also attended Flinders University.

Richardson was married to Nicole, a writer. They have three children and lived in Melbourne. In December 2016, it was announced that Richardson had separated from his wife and was dating Fifi Box.

Richardson led an anti-vaccination protest in Melbourne in 2021. He attends a Baptist church and has written for Caldron Pool.

Career
Richardson has had guest stints in several Australian television shows, including Neighbours as Kim White, Blue Heelers, Stingers, and McLeod's Daughters as Tom Braiden. Richardson co-wrote The Belly Of The Whale with Luke Elliot. The play won Best New Comedy-Drama at the Melbourne Fringe Festival in 1996. He has had roles in feature films Everynight ... Everynight (1994), Blabbermouth & Stickybeak (1998), Redball (1999), A Telephone Call for Genevieve Snow and Mallboy (2001).

Richardson starred in the 2002 Australian crime film The Hard Word, alongside Guy Pearce and Joel Edgerton. He plays Mal Twentyman, one of three back-robbing brothers. Pearce recommended Richardson to director Scott Roberts, after they worked together in a play two years earlier. Richardson followed his role in The Hard Word with a part in the comedy-thriller Horseplay. For his role of Ken, a stalker, in The Secret Life of Us, Richardson received a nomination for Best Actor in a Supporting or Guest Role in a Television Drama or Comedy at the 2003 Australian Film Institute Awards.

Richardson played Detective Matt Ryan in the Seven Network crime drama City Homicide from 2007 until the show's cancellation in 2011. Richardson initially played a minor role in the unaired pilot, but he proved popular with the test audience and he was asked to attend a screen test for the main cast, where he received the role of Matt. Richardson also appeared in writer/director Matthew Saville's drama film Noise (2007), followed by Dee McLachlan's drama film The Jammed (2007), and Eric Manchester's suspense film Torn (2010).

After he finished filming the fifth season of City Homicide, Richardson appeared in the Melbourne Theatre Company production of The Water Carriers. In 2012, Richardson guested in an episode of the ABC comedy series Lowdown, and was cast as Chris in the Bell Shakespeare production of The School for Wives. He also appeared in the television film Fatal Honeymoon alongside Harvey Keitel, Billy Miller and Gary Sweet. Since 2012, Richardson has appeared as lawyer Drew Greer in the Jack Irish television films and the 2016 television series.

In 2014, Richardson re-joined the cast of Neighbours in the recurring role of Gary Canning. Richardson reprised the role the following year and returned in 2016 as part of the main cast. Richardson starred alongside Kate Kendall in the 2015 production of Frankie and Johnny in the Clair de Lune. The play was directed by their fellow Neighbours co-star and Richardson's on-screen mother Colette Mann. Richardson has made guest appearances as Detective Michael Mears in Wentworth, and Gary Riles in Nowhere Boys. Richardson left Neighbours in March 2020 after his character was killed off.

Richardson stood as an independent candidate for the Victorian Senate in the 2022 Australian federal election. He later stood in the 2022 Victorian state election representing the right wing Freedom Party of Victoria.

Filmography

Film

Television

References

External links
 

Living people
1969 births
Victorian College of the Arts alumni
21st-century Australian male actors
Male actors from Adelaide
Australian anti-vaccination activists
Australian male television actors
Australian male film actors
20th-century Australian male actors
Independent politicians in Australia
Australian Baptists
Flinders University alumni
Politicians from Adelaide